Holy Cross College, Strabane is a co-ed bilateral school in Strabane, County Tyrone, Northern Ireland.  It contains over 1500 pupils and over 90 members of staff.

History
Holy Cross College opened in September 2004 following the amalgamation of Strabane's three Catholic post-primary schools, the Convent Grammar School, St Colman's High School and Our Lady of Mercy High School.  It is a bilateral school which means it has both grammar and non-selective streams, with the two groups of students taught separately.

The college's first principal was Sean Bradley. He was succeeded by Maria Doherty who took the job of principal after Christmas 2008.  In turn, she was  succeeded by Mrs Claire Bradley who took over as Principal in September 2018.

Campus
The new campus for Holy Cross College opened on September 1, 2008.

Facilities
Holy Cross College has an all-weather pitch, three grass pitches, five tennis courts, two gymnasia and a sports hall. The actual school itself has over 100 classrooms each able to hold 30 or more pupils. Every year it takes in more than 250 pupils. Its largest ever intake of pupils was in the year 2013 when the school took 365 pupils. The school car park can hold 150 cars

Notable staff
 Brian McGilloway - crime fiction author

Past Pupils
 Ciara Ferguson - politician; attended Convent Grammar School

References

External links 
 

Educational institutions established in 2004
Catholic secondary schools in Northern Ireland
Secondary schools in County Tyrone
2004 establishments in Northern Ireland
Strabane